Jose Maria Flores Lacaba, popularly known as Pete Lacaba, is a Filipino screenwriter, editor, poet, journalist and translator.

Early life
Born in Misamis Oriental in 1945 to Jose Monreal Lacaba of Loon, Bohol and Fe Flores from Pateros, Rizal. He is the brother of writer and activist Eman Lacaba, who was murdered in March 1976 and later honored at the Philippines' Bantayog ng mga Bayani memorial as a martyr who fought the Marcos dictatorship.

Early career
He is also well known for his role in the fight against President Ferdinand Marcos and his US-backed military dictatorship during the Philippines' martial law era. Among his most notable works during this time are his coverage of the First Quarter Storm protests for the Philippines Free Press magazine, which were compiled into the book Days of Disquiet, Nights of Rage in 1982, and the controversial poem "Prometheus Unbound," an acrostic poem through which he managed to trick the publishers of a pro-Marcos magazine to publish a secretly anti-Marcos message.

Lacaba has been especially recognized for his coverage of the First Quarter Storm, an anti-Marcos movement, in 1970. His firsthand account of the events of the First Quarter Storm protests, Days of Disquiet, Nights of Rage (1982), compiled from articles first published in the Philippine Free Press and the Asia-Philippines Leader magazines, are considered important accounts of that period.

Another influential work Lacaba wrote during this period, under the nom de plume Ruben Cuevas, was the poem "Prometheus Unbound," which was published by Focus, a magazine allied with the Marcos regime. The editors did not immediately realize that the work was an acrostic poem, whose first letters spelled out the popular protest slogan "Marcos Hitler Diktador Tuta" (Marcos, Hitler, Dictator, Lapdog).

Later career
Lacaba is recognized as one of the leading figures in Philippine literature today. He is well known in various fields, including creative writing, journalism, editing and scriptwriting.

He worked with well-known directors like Lino Brocka and Mike de Leon in producing films that expose ordinary people's lives that experienced poverty and injustice. His screenplay credits include Jaguar, which competed at the Cannes International Film Festival in 1980, while Bayan Ko: Kapit sa Patalim competed in 1984. Orapronobis was screened out of competition in 1989. Ricky Lee co-wrote Jaguar with Lacaba.

He continued writing poems, and in 1999, was decorated as one of 100 "Bayani ng Sining".  Lacaba's poetry has been compiled in collections which include Ang Mga Kagilagilalas na Pakikipagsapalaran ni Juan de la Cruz (1979), Sa Daigdig ng Kontradiksyon (1991) and Sa Panahon ng Ligalig (1991). 

Lacaba is currently the executive editor of Summit Media's YES! magazine, the sister publication of PEP. 

In honor of Lacaba for being the 2008 Lifetime Achievement Awardee, the classic film Bayan Ko was screened as the closing film of Dekada Cinemanila. According to Anima Aguiluz, the daughter of Direk Tikoy and festival programmer of Cinemanila, Bayan Ko could be found in Toronto, Canada.

Works

Screenwriter
Jaguar (1979)
Angela Markado (1980; as Jose Lacaba)
Pakawalan Mo Ako (1981)
Boatman (1984; additional dialogue)
Sister Stella L. (1984)
Experience (1984)
This Is My Country (1985)
Victor Corpuz (1987) (writer)... aka Get Victor Corpus: The Rebel Soldier (Philippines: English title)
Fight for Us (1989) (writer)... aka Fight for Us... aka Insoumis, Les (France)
Eskapo (1995) (screenplay) ... aka Escape (Philippines: English title: literal title)
Bagong Bayani (1995) (writer)... aka A New Hero (Philippines: English title)... aka Flor Contemplacion's Last Wish ... aka Unsung Heroine (USA)
Segurista (1996) (writer)... aka Dead Sure ... aka The Insurance Agent (International: English title)
Rizal sa Dapitan (1997) (screenplay)... aka Rizal in Dapitan
Tatsulok (1998) (writer) ... aka Triangle (International: English title)

Miscellaneous crew
Imelda (2003) (translator: dialogue) (as Jose Lacaba)

Soundtrack
Sister Stella L. (1984) (lyrics: "Sangandaan," "Aling Pag-ibig Pa?")

Self
Imelda (2003) (as Pete Lacaba) .... Himself

Discography
Tagubilin at Habilin (2003, Viva Records)
Prometheus Unbound

Awards and achievements
Star Awards for Movies
(Nominated) Original Screenplay of the Year for Segurista (1996) shared with Amable Aguiluz and Amado Lacuesta, 1997
Star Award, Adapted Screenplay of the Year for Rizal sa Dapitan (1997), 1998

Metro Manila Film Festival
Festival Prize, Best Screenplay for Rizal sa Dapitan (1997)

Gawad Urian Awards
Best Screenplay (Pinakamahusay na Dulang Pampelikula) for Jaguar (1979) shared with Ricardo Lee, 1980
Best Screenplay (Pinakamahusay na Dulang Pampelikula) for Sister Stella L. (1984) shared with Jose Almojuela Mike De Leon, 1985
Best Screenplay (Pinakamahusay na Dulang Pampelikula) for Bayan ko: Kapit sa patalim (1985), 1986
(Nominated) Best Screenplay (Pinakamahusay na Dulang Pampelikula) for Bagong bayani (1995, 1996)
Best Screenplay (Pinakamahusay na Dulang Pampelikula) for Segurista (1996) shared with Amable Aguiluz Amado Lacuesta, 1997

FAP Awards, Philippines
Best Story Adaptation for Bayan ko: Kapit sa patalim (1985), 1986

FAMAS Awards
Best Screenplay for Rizal sa Dapitan (1997), 1998

Cinemanila International Film Festival
The 10th edition of the Cinemanila International Film Festival conferred the 2008 Lifetime Achievement Award to screenplay writer Jose "Pete" Lacaba Jr.

Other awards
Lacaba received the Aruna Vasudev Lifetime Achievement Award at the 10th Osian's-Cinefan Festival of Arab and Asian Cinema in New Delhi, India.

Trivia
Jose Maria Flores Lacaba Jr. Usual byline: Jose F. Lacaba. The late Jose Sr. was nicknamed Pepe, so Jr. was nicknamed Pepito, the little Pepe. In college, Pepito's nickname got shortened to Pito, then Pit, but the last gave rise to jokes about armpits, so Pit was respelled Pete.

References

1945 births
Living people
20th-century Filipino poets
20th-century male writers
Boholano writers
Filipino male poets
People from Cagayan de Oro
Writers from Misamis Oriental